Pirtobrutinib, sold under the brand name Jaypirca, is an anticancer medication that is used to treat mantle cell lymphoma. It inhibits B cell lymphocyte proliferation and survival by binding and inhibiting Bruton's tyrosine kinase (BTK). It is taken by mouth.

The most common adverse reactions include fatigue, musculoskeletal pain, diarrhea, edema, dyspnea, pneumonia, and bruising. Grade 3 or 4 laboratory abnormalities include decreased neutrophil counts, lymphocyte counts, and platelet counts.

Pirtobrutinib was approved for medical use in the United States in January 2023.

Medical uses
In the US, pirtobrutinib is indicated to treat relapsed or refractory mantle cell lymphoma after at least two lines of systemic therapy, including a Bruton's tyrosine kinase (BTK) inhibitor.

Mechanism of action
B cells are white cells of the lymphocyte subtype that produce antibodies, but when some of them grow uncontrollably they can be a cause of cancer. A key enzyme in B cell stimulation and survival is BTK, and pirtobrutinib inhibits BTK in a way that is different from the prototypical BTK inhibitor ibrutinib by binding in a different way that avoids a genetic change (mutation at active site cysteine residue C481 in BTK) that can make some tumors less responsive to ibrutinib.

History
Pirtobrutinib is manufactured by Eli Lilly and Company and was approved by the US Food and Drug Administration in January 2023, for the treatment of mantle cell lymphoma that has become refractory to other BTK inhibitors.

Efficacy was evaluated in BRUIN (NCT03740529), an open-label, multicenter, single-arm trial of pirtobrutinib monotherapy that included 120 participants with MCL previously treated with a BTK inhibitor. Participants had a median of three prior lines of therapy, with 93% having two or more prior lines. The most common prior BTK inhibitors received were ibrutinib (67%), acalabrutinib (30%), and zanubrutinib (8%); 83% had discontinued their last BTK inhibitor due to refractory or progressive disease.

References

Further reading 
 
 
 

Tyrosine kinase inhibitors
Eli Lilly and Company brands
Orphan drugs
Methoxy compounds
Amides
Amines
Fluoroarenes
Trifluoromethyl compounds
Carboxamides
Pyrazoles